The first Golden Age of Science Fiction, often recognized in the United States as the period from 1938 to 1946, was an era during which the science fiction genre gained wide public attention and many classic science fiction stories were published. In the history of science fiction, the Golden Age follows the "pulp era" of the 1920s and 1930s, and precedes New Wave science fiction of the 1960s and 1970s. The 1950s are a transitional period in this scheme; however, Robert Silverberg, who came of age in the 1950s, saw that decade as the true Golden Age.

According to historian Adam Roberts, "the phrase Golden Age valorises a particular sort of writing: 'Hard SF', linear narratives, heroes solving problems or countering threats in a space-opera or technological-adventure idiom."

From Gernsback to Campbell

One leading influence on the creation of the Golden Age was John W. Campbell, who became legendary in the genre as an editor and publisher of science fiction magazines, including Astounding Science Fiction, to such an extent that Isaac Asimov stated that "...in the 1940s, (Campbell) dominated the field to the point where to many seemed all of science fiction." Under Campbell's editorship, science fiction developed more realism and psychological depth to characterization than it exhibited in the Gernsbackian "super science" era. The focus shifted from the gizmo itself to the characters using the gizmo.

Most fans agree that the Golden Age began around 1938–1939, slightly later than the Golden Age of Detective Fiction, another pulp-based genre. The July 1939 issue of Astounding Science Fiction  is sometimes cited as the start of the Golden Age. It included "Black Destroyer", the first published story by A. E. van Vogt, and the first appearance of Isaac Asimov ("Trends") in the magazine. Science fiction writer John C. Wright said of Van Vogt's story, "This one started it all." The August issue contained the first published story by Robert A. Heinlein ("Life-Line").

Robert Silverberg in a 2010 essay argued that the true Golden Age was the 1950s, saying that “Golden Age” of the 1940s was a kind of "false dawn". "Until the decade of the fifties", Silverberg wrote, "there was essentially no market for science fiction books at all"; the audience supported only a few special interest small presses. The 1950s saw "a spectacular outpouring of stories and novels that quickly surpassed both in quantity and quality the considerable achievement of the Campbellian golden age", as mainstream companies like Simon & Schuster and Doubleday displaced specialty publishers like Arkham House and Gnome Press.

Developments in the genre

Many of the most enduring science fiction tropes were established in Golden Age literature. Space opera came to prominence with the works of E. E. "Doc" Smith; Isaac Asimov established the canonical Three Laws of Robotics beginning with the 1941 short story "Runaround"; the same period saw the writing of genre classics such as the Asimov's Foundation and Smith's Lensman series. Another frequent characteristic of Golden Age science fiction is the celebration of scientific achievement and the sense of wonder; Asimov's short story "Nightfall" exemplifies this, as in a single night a planet's civilization is overwhelmed by the revelation of the vastness of the universe. Robert A. Heinlein's 1950s novels, such as The Puppet Masters, Double Star, and Starship Troopers, express the libertarian ideology that runs through much of Golden Age science fiction.

Algis Budrys in 1965 wrote of the "recurrent strain in 'Golden Age' science fiction of the 1940s—the implication that sheer technological accomplishment would solve all the problems, hooray, and that all the problems were what they seemed to be on the surface". The Golden Age also saw the re-emergence of the religious or spiritual themes—central to so much proto-science fiction before the pulp era—that Hugo Gernsback had tried to eliminate in his vision of "scientifiction".  Among the most significant such Golden Age narratives are Bradbury's The Martian Chronicles, Clarke's Childhood's End, Blish's A Case of Conscience, and Miller's A Canticle for Leibowitz.

Cultural significance

As a phenomenon that affected the psyches of a great many adolescents during World War II and the ensuing Cold War, science fiction's Golden Age has left a lasting impression upon society.  The beginning of the Golden Age coincided with the first Worldcon in 1939 and, especially for its most involved fans, science fiction was becoming a powerful social force.  The genre, particularly during its Golden Age, had significant, if somewhat indirect, effects upon leaders in the military, information technology, Hollywood and science itself, especially biotechnology and the pharmaceutical industry.

Prominent authors
A number of influential science fiction authors emerged in the early Golden Age (1938–1946), including the following:

 Isaac Asimov (1920–1992)
 Alfred Bester (1913–1987)
 James Blish (1921–1975)
 Nelson S. Bond (1908–2006)
 Leigh Brackett (1915–1978)
 Ray Bradbury (1920–2012)
 Fredric Brown (1906–1972)
 A. Bertram Chandler (1912–1984)
 John Christopher (1922–2012)
 Hal Clement (1922–2003)
 L. Sprague de Camp (1907–2000)
 Lester del Rey (1915–1992)
 Robert A. Heinlein (1907–1988)
 L. Ron Hubbard (1911–1986)
 Henry Kuttner (1915–1958)
 Fritz Leiber (1910–1992)
 Murray Leinster (1896–1975)
 C. L. Moore (1911–1987)
 Frederik Pohl (1919–2013)
 Ross Rocklynne (1913–1988)
 Eric Frank Russell (1905–1978)
 Clifford D. Simak (1904–1988)
 E. E. "Doc" Smith (1890–1965)
 Theodore Sturgeon (1918–1985)
 William Tenn (1920–2010)
 A. E. van Vogt (1912–2000)
 Jack Vance (1916–2013)
 Jack Williamson (1908–2006)
 John Wyndham (1903–1969)

and in the later Golden Age (1947–1959):

 Arthur C. Clarke (1917–2008)
 Poul Anderson (1926–2001)
 Philip K. Dick (1928–1982)
 James E. Gunn (1923–2020)
 C. M. Kornbluth (1923–1958)
 Walter M. Miller, Jr. (1923–1996)
 Chad Oliver (1928–1993)
 Robert Silverberg (1935–)

End of the Golden Age
Asimov said that "The dropping of the atom bomb in 1945 made science fiction respectable" to the general public. He recalled in 1969 "I'll never forget the shock that rumbled through the entire world of science fiction fandom when ... Heinlein broke the 'slicks' barrier by having an undiluted science fiction story of his published in The Saturday Evening Post. The large, mainstream companies' entry into the science fiction book market around 1950 was similar to how they published crime fiction during World War II; authors no longer could only publish through magazines. Asimov said, however, that

He continued, "In fact, there was the birth of something I called 'tomorrow fiction'; the science fiction story that was no more new than tomorrow's headlines. Believe me, there can be nothing duller than tomorrow's headlines in science fiction", citing Nevil Shute's On the Beach as example.

It is harder to specify the end of the Golden Age of Science Fiction than its beginning, but several factors changed the market for magazine science fiction in the mid- and late 1950s. Most important was the rapid contraction of the pulp market: Fantastic Adventures and Famous Fantastic Mysteries folded in 1953, Planet Stories, Startling Stories, Thrilling Wonder Stories and Beyond in 1955, Other Worlds and Science Fiction Quarterly in 1957, Imagination, Imaginative Tales, and Infinity in 1958. In October 1957, the successful launch of the Soviet satellite Sputnik 1 narrowed the gap between the real world and the world of science fiction, sending the West into a space race with the East. Asimov shifted to writing nonfiction he hoped would attract young minds to science, while Robert A. Heinlein became more dogmatic in expressing political and social views in his fiction. Emerging British writers, such as Brian W. Aldiss and J. G. Ballard, cultivated a more literary style, indicating the direction other writers would soon pursue. Women writers, such as Joanna Russ and Judith Merril, emerged. When the leading Golden Age magazine, Astounding Stories of Super-Science, changed its title to Analog Science Fiction and Fact in 1960, it was clear the Golden Age of Science Fiction was over.

References

External links
 Fear of Fiction: Campbell's World and Other Obsolete Paradigms, at Infinity Plus, by Claude Lalumière
 'John W. Campbell's Golden Age of Science Fiction: An irreplaceable documentary illuminates the man who invented modern science fiction, by Paul Di Filippo, at SciFi.com
 Google Books – 'Age of Wonders Chapter One: The Golden Age of Science Fiction is Twelve', David G. Hartwell (1996)
 YouTube.com – Isaac Asimov on the Golden Age of Science Fiction

Science fiction culture
Science Fiction
Nostalgia in the United States
American science fiction